The morning is the part of the day from either midnight or dawn to noon.

Morning(s) or The Morning may also refer to:

Film, television and radio
Morning (film), a 2010 American film by Leland Orser
The Morning (film), a 1967 Yugoslav film
A Morning, a Canadian morning television show 1997–2009
Today Extra, formerly Mornings, an Australian morning television talk show
"Mornings" (Master of None), a television episode
Mornings (CBC Music), a Canadian morning radio program

Music
Symphony No. 6 (Haydn), nicknamed "Morning", 1761

Albums
Morning (Amel Larrieux album) or the title song, 2006
Morning (Janice Vidal album) or the title song, 2009
Morning (Kenny Drew album) or the title song, 1975
The Morning (Andrew Osenga album), 2006
The Morning (Lewis Watson album), 2014
Morning (EP), by Mae, 2009

Songs
"Morning" (Clare Fischer composition), 1965
"Morning" (Teyana Taylor and Kehlani song), 2019
"Mornin, by Al Jarreau from Jarreau, 1983
"Morning", by Beck from Morning Phase, 2014
"Morning", by G Flip from About Us, 2019
"Morning", by Iron & Wine from Around the Well, 2009
"Morning", by Val Doonican, 1972
"Morning", by Wet Wet Wet from Picture This, 1995
"Morning", by Zara Larsson from Poster Girl, 2021
"Morning", written by Frank Lebby Stanton (lyrics) and Oley Speaks (music), 1910
"The Morning", by Raekwon, Pusha T, Common, 2 Chainz, Cyhi the Prynce, Kid Cudi, and D'banj from Cruel Summer, 2012
"The Morning", by Robert Forster from Inferno, 2019
"The Morning", by the Weeknd from House of Balloons, 2011

Other uses
Morning (Hord), a sculpture by Donal Hord in San Diego, California, US
Morning (magazine), a weekly Japanese seinen manga magazine

See also

Asahi (disambiguation)
Mourning
Sabah (newspaper), a Turkish daily newspaper